Lowick is a civil parish in the South Lakeland District of Cumbria, England.  It contains two listed buildings that are recorded in the National Heritage List for England.  Of these, one is are listed at Grade II*, the middle of the three grades, and the other is at Grade II, the lowest grade.  The parish is in the Lake District National Park, it contains the village of Lowick, and is otherwise rural.  The listed buildings consist of a hall dating from the 16th century, and a 19th-century church.


Key

Buildings

References

Citations

Sources

Lists of listed buildings in Cumbria